Oxylobus may refer to:
 Oxylobus (beetle), a genus of beetles in the family Carabidae
 Oxylobus (plant), a genus of plant in the sunflower family